Durant is an unincorporated community in Hillsborough County, Florida, United States. Durant has a post office with ZIP code 33530, which opened on August 27, 1902. Durant is home to Durant High School.

History
In 1895, the Sarasota Subdivision rail line was built from Durant to Sarasota, and later extended north to Turkey Creek. The line was in use until it was acquired by CSX in 1981. CSX continued to store cars on the track in Durant until 1986.

References

Unincorporated communities in Hillsborough County, Florida
Unincorporated communities in Florida
1902 establishments in Florida